Oodaaq or Oodap Qeqertaa is a bank of gravel and silt northeast of Greenland that has been considered by some to be the northernmost point of land on Earth, though a number of other places have also been given that title since its discovery. It may have been created by the impact of an iceberg in a shallow sea. However, the area of ice in which it appears does not move from year to year. If it was created by an iceberg, then it must have happened long ago.

Location
When discovered it measured a mere .

History 
It was discovered in 1978 when a Danish survey team led by Uffe Petersen landed a helicopter on Kaffeklubben Island to confirm that it did indeed lie further north than the tip of Greenland. The survey team landed on the island in a helicopter and later named it Oodaaq after the Inuk who accompanied Robert Peary on his journey to the North Pole.

Debate 
Gravel banks such as this are generally considered not to qualify for the title of world's northernmost point of land as they are rarely permanent. In fact several subsequent expeditions have claimed that Oodaaq has now disappeared beneath the ocean.

A number of other locations have since been called the northernmost point. The scientists proposed the island be called "Qeqertaq Avannarleq", Greenlandic for "the northernmost island". Rene Forsberg, head of geodynamics at the National Space Institute in Denmark, said Qeqertaq Avannarleq "meets the criteria of an island", though he noted that "these small islands come and go".

In July 2001, the Return to the Top of the World Expedition came to the conclusion that the previously-discovered island and permanent land feature ATOW1996 was the northernmost point of land on earth. 

In July 1998, Peter Skafte photographed, during an aerial reconnaissance, a small island farther north than any previously observed. During July 2003, Peter Skafte, Mara Boland and Dennis Schmitt, plus three other people walked out over the melting sea ice to the new island. Later Ken Zerbst failed to locate the island in 2008 while using a helicopter.

There are several possible explanations for the failure to locate the island in 2008.

 The island may not be a permanent land feature connected to the bottom of the sea.

 Seasonal and yearly accumulation of snow and ice has rendered the island invisible.

 The island was discovered in a belt of multiyear fast ice, but global warming has eroded this layer of ice along the Greenland coast. Perhaps the island has been exposed to the force of the drift ice and has been 'bulldozed' away.

 The GPS coordinates for the island's location are most likely inaccurate. GPS satellites are low on the horizon near the North Pole, which may cause a GPS to yield inaccurate results.
In late 2004, the Eighth Edition of the National Geographic World Atlas was released. It clearly shows Oodaaq as the northernmost landmass on Earth. In August 2005 and 2006, Peter Skafte, Allen Deforest (satellite engineer), and Paul Lommen (physicist) conducted a search for new islands north of Greenland, using high-resolution satellite images. 

Two sets of images were obtained, one year apart, to determine if any of the new islands had moved. The team named it "Skafte Island" and posted it on a website. They also sent two reports about their findings to Hauge Anderson at the Danish Polar Center, one in 2005 and another in 2006. Dennis Schmitt was shown an image of "Skafte Island" before his departure with a group of people to North Greenland in 2007. He visited the island and made the claim that he had discovered a new northernmost island.

See also 

 Northernmost point of land
 Stray Dog West
 Kaffeklubben Island
 Cape Morris Jesup
 83-42
 ATOW1996

References

Uninhabited islands of Greenland